Mohammed Mahdi Ameen al-Bayati (born 1962) is an Iraqi politician who was Minister of Human Rights from 9 September 2014 to 16 August 2015. He is a Shia Turkmen from the northern Iraqi town of Amirli. He is a leading member of the Badr Organization, a Shi'ite militia that opposed the government of Saddam Hussein from exile in Iran.

Political activities 
He was elected to the Council of Representatives of Iraq in December 2005 as part of the National Iraqi Alliance, a pan-Shiite list that won a plurality of the seats in the election. He was allocated a seat as a representative of the Badr Organization. While serving as an MP, in 2007, his convoy was attacked as he travelled to Kirkuk, killing four of his relatives. He opposed the presence of Iraqi Kurdish peshmerga forces in the disputed territories of Kirkuk, Mosul and Salah-ud-Din, saying it  was "unconstitutional".

He was appointed Human Rights minister in the cabinet of Prime Minister Haider al-Abadi, which was confirmed by the Council of Representatives on 9 September 2014.  He defended the record of the Iraqi government, denying that they had committed abuses against the Sunni Arab minority and describing the number of human rights violations committed by the Popular Mobilization Forces, Shiite volunteer militias forced to fight against the Islamic State of Iraq and the Levant, as "tiny".  He said the government had "little choice" but to rely on the militias as otherwise ISIL would have taken over the entire country. He asked the United Arab Emirates to remove the Badr Organisation and the Saraya Al-Salam, a militia from the Sadrist Movement, from their list of terrorist organisations.

He supported the government's continued use of the death penalty, claiming it acted as a deterrent to foreign fighters. "If they hear the news that we have stopped the death penalty the whole world will come to Iraq to fight". He strongly opposed an amnesty for those facing the death penalty, asking "how about an amnesty for all those already put in their graves by terrorists?" 

His ministry funded the purchase and emancipation of Yazidi women, thousands of whom had been abducted and enslaved by ISIS in Mosul since their capture of areas of northern Iraq.

In January 2015 he was involved in a controversy when his security guards allegedly attacked traffic police who stopped his convoy as it drove through the Yarmouk district of the capital Baghdad. The prime minister announced an investigation into the incident.

In August 2015, responding to popular demonstrations against government corruption and inefficiency, Prime Minister Haider al-Abadi announced a reduction in the number of ministers, abolishing the Human Rights ministry. As a result, al Bayati left the cabinet.

References 

Iraqi Shia Muslims
Iraqi Turkmen people
Living people
Human rights ministers of Iraq
1962 births
Badr Brigade members
Members of the Council of Representatives of Iraq